Bidlu may refer to:
 Bidlu, East Azerbaijan
 Bidlu, Markazi